? (Question Mark) is a Christian progressive rock concept album by multi-instrumentalist Neal Morse, his fifth studio album. Released in 2005, this single-CD album is about the Israelite tabernacle in the wilderness found in the books of Exodus, Leviticus, and Numbers of the Hebrew Bible.  Morse has stated that this album should be considered one long epic track rather than twelve separate tracks.

The main band is Neal, Mike Portnoy (ex-Dream Theater), and Randy George (Ajalon) with guests Mark Leniger, Alan Morse (Spock's Beard), Roine Stolt (The Flower Kings), Steve Hackett (Genesis), and Jordan Rudess (Dream Theater).

Track listing
All songs written by Neal Morse except where noted:

Musicians
 Neal Morse – keyboards, guitars, vocals
 Mike Portnoy – drums
 Randy George – bass
 Jordan Rudess – keyboards
 Roine Stolt – guitars
 Alan Morse – guitars
 Steve Hackett – guitars
 Mark Leniger – guitars
 Chris Carmichael – violin, cello
 Michael Thurman – French horn
 Rachel Rigdon – violin
 Jim Hoke – saxophone
 Debbie Bresee – background vocals
 Jay Dawson – bagpipes
 Revonna Cooper – vocals
 Amy Pippin – vocals
 Debbie Bresee – vocals
 Wade Brown – vocals
 Joey Pippin – vocals

Personnel
 Jerry Guidroz – engineer
 Ken Love – mastering
 Rich Mouser – mixing
 Thomas Ewerhard

Release details
2005, USA, Inside Out Records SPV08548622, Release Date 1 November 2005, CD

References

Neal Morse albums
2005 albums
Concept albums
Inside Out Music albums